Ayyala Somayajulu Ganapathi Sastry, also known as Ganapati Muni (1878–1936), was a disciple of Ramana Maharshi. He was also variously known as "Kavyakantha" (one who has poetry in his throat), and "Nayana" by his disciples.

Biography
Ganapati Muni was born in Kalavarayai near Bobbili in Andhra Pradesh on 17 November 1878. His parents, Narasimha Sastri and Narasamamba had three sons, Muni being the second. Ganapati, when 18 years old, set out and wandered from one place to another, residing in places like Bhuvaneshwar, where he performed his tapas. When Ganapati was staying in Varanasi he learned of an assembly of Sanskrit scholars in the city of Nabadwip in Bengal. He participated in it and on passing the tests in extempore Sanskrit prose and poetry, was conferred the title 'Kavyakantha'. He was then 22 years old. He returned home at the age of 25. From Kanchipuram he came to Arunachala (Tiruvannamalai) in 1903 to perform tapas. At that time he visited Ramana Maharshi, who was then known as Brahmanaswami, before he accepted a teaching post in Vellore in 1904. He wrote his devotional epic hymn "Uma Sahasram," One Thousand Verses on Uma (goddess Parvathi), after accepting Ramana Maharshi as his Guru on 18 November 1907. He also met Sri Aurobindo on 15 August 1928. Ganapati Muni died at Kharagpur on 25 July 1936.

Influence
Ganapati Muni's teachings are laid out in his magnum opus, 'Uma Sahasram' and other works like 'Mahavidyadi Sutras'. They helped to reduce popular prejudice about the teachings of Tantra.

His students include T.V. Kapali Sastry.

Literary works
 Umasahasram
  An anthology of the teachings of Ramana Maharshi, along with English translations.

References

Books
Gunturu, Lakshmi Kantam. (1958). NAYANA: Kavyakantha Vasishtha Ganapati Muni : Biography in Telugu. J.V.S.Lakshmi, Chennai. (Latest reprint : 2013).

Krishna, G. (1978). Nayana: Kavyakantha Vasishtha Ganapati Muni : biography. Madras: Kavyakantha Vasishtha Ganapati Muni Trust. 
Gaṇapatimuni, Vāsiṣṭha [Honoree] (1978), Jayanti: Kavyakanta Ganapati Muni centenary commemoration volume. Kavyakantha Centenary Committee.

External links 
 Collected Works of Vasishtha Ganapati Muni
 Biography by Shri. K. Natesan
 Guru Mahaprasaddhavan's Tribute to Kavyakantha Sri Ganapati Sastri
 http://kavyakantha.arunachala.org/KNatesan.htm

20th-century Indian philosophers
1878 births
1936 deaths
Indian spiritual teachers
20th-century Indian writers
Writers from Andhra Pradesh
People from Vizianagaram district
20th-century Indian male writers